Ferulago is a genus of flowering plants in the family Apiaceae.

Species
, Plants of the World Online accepted the following species:
Ferulago abbreviata C.C.Towns.
Ferulago akpulatii Akalın & Gürdal
Ferulago angulata (Schltdl.) Boiss.
Ferulago antiochia Saya & Miski
Ferulago armena (DC.) Bernardi
Ferulago asparagifolia Boiss.
Ferulago aucheri Boiss.
Ferulago bernardii Tomk. & Pimenov
Ferulago biumbellata Pomel
Ferulago blancheana Post ex Boiss.
Ferulago brachyloba Boiss. & Reut.
Ferulago bracteata Boiss. & Hausskn.
Ferulago carduchorum Boiss. & Hausskn.
Ferulago cassia Boiss.
Ferulago contracta Boiss. & Hausskn.
Ferulago galbanifera (Mill.) W.D.J.Koch
Ferulago glareosa Kandemir & Hedge
Ferulago granatensis Boiss.
Ferulago humilis Boiss.
Ferulago idaea Özhatay & Akalin
Ferulago isaurica Peşmen
Ferulago kurdica Post
Ferulago lutea (Poir.) Grande
Ferulago macedonica Micevski & E.Mayer
Ferulago macrocarpa (Fenzl) Boiss.
Ferulago macrosciadea Boiss. & Balansa
Ferulago mughlae Peşmen
Ferulago nodosa (L.) Boiss.
Ferulago pachyloba (Fenzl) Boiss.
Ferulago phialocarpa Rech.f. & Riedl
Ferulago platycarpa Boiss. & Balansa
Ferulago sandrasica Peşmen & Quézel
Ferulago sartorii Boiss.
Ferulago scabra Pomel
Ferulago serpentinica Rech.f.
Ferulago setifolia K.Koch
Ferulago silaifolia (Boiss.) Boiss.
Ferulago stellata Boiss.
Ferulago subvelutina Rech.f.
Ferulago sylvatica (Besser) Rchb.
Ferulago syriaca Boiss.
Ferulago ternatifolia Solanas, M.B.Crespo & García-Martín
Ferulago thirkeana Boiss.
Ferulago thyrsiflora (Sm.) W.D.J.Koch
Ferulago trachycarpa Boiss.
Ferulago trojana Akalın & Pimenov
Ferulago vesceritensis Coss. & Durieu ex Batt.
Ferulago westii (Post) Pimenov & Kljuykov

References

Apioideae
Apioideae genera